Rudbar-e Naqib Deh (also Romanized as Rūdbār-e Naqīb Deh) is a village in Tangeh Soleyman Rural District, Kolijan Rostaq District, Sari County, Mazandaran Province, Iran. At the 2006 census, its population was 10, in 4 families.

References 

Populated places in Sari County